Joseph of Leonessa, O.F.M. Cap.,
(1556 – February 4, 1612) is a saint of the Catholic Church.

Life
He was born Eufranio Desiderio at Leonessa, a small town then in Umbria, now in the Lazio.  It is said that from a young age he showed a remarkably religious bent of mind; he used to erect little altars and spend much time in prayer before them, and often he would gather his companions and induce them to pray with him.

Whilst yet a boy he used to take the discipline on Fridays in company with the Confraternity of the Holy Savior. He was educated by his uncle, who had planned a suitable marriage for him, but in his sixteenth year he fell sick of a fever, and upon his recovery, without consulting his guardian, he joined the Capuchin reform of the Franciscan Order. He made his novitiate at the friary of the Carcerelle near Assisi.

As a friar he was remarkable for his great abstinence. "Brother Ass", he would say to his body, "there is no need to feed thee as a noble horse would be fed: thou must be content to be a poor ass." In 1599, the year before the Jubilee year, he fasted the whole year by way of preparation for gaining the indulgence.

At Constantinople
In 1587 he was sent by the Minister General of his Order to Constantinople to minister to the Christians held captive there. Arrived there he and his companions lodged in the Galata district in a derelict house of Benedictine monks, actually the St. Benedict high school. The poverty in which the friars lived attracted the attention of the Turks, who went in numbers to see the new missionaries. He was very solicitous in ministering to the captive Christians in the galleys of the Ottoman Empire's navy. Every day he went into the city to preach, and he was at length thrown into prison and only released at the intervention of the Venetian agent.

Urged on by zeal he at last sought to enter the palace to preach before Sultan Murad III and tried to convert Muslims, but he was seized and condemned to death. For three days he hung on the gallows, held up by two hooks driven through his right hand and foot; his legends state that he was then miraculously released by an angel.

Return to Italy
Returning to Italy, he took with him a Greek archbishop who had apostatized, and who was reconciled to the church on their arrival in Rome. Joseph now took up the work of home missions in his native province, sometimes preaching six or seven times a day. In the Jubilee year of 1600 he gave the Lenten sermons at Otricoli, a town through which crowds of pilgrims passed on their way to Rome. Many of them being very poor, Joseph supplied them with food; he also washed their clothes and cut their hair. At Todi he cultivated with his own hands a garden, the produce of which was for the poor.

He died at Amatrice in 1612.

He was canonized by Pope Benedict XIV in 1746. His feast day is kept on February 4, within the Franciscan Order. In his hometown, there is a church and sanctuary of San Giuseppe da Leonessa.  The main street is named after him, the Corso San Giuseppe.  Devotion to him is largely in central Italy; churches in Otricoli, San Lorenzo Nuovo, and Rivodutri contain paintings of him.

References

External links

Joseph of Leonessa at the Catholic Encyclopedia

S. Giuseppe of Leonessa at Thayer's Gazetteer

Joseph of Leonessa
Joseph of Leonessa
Joseph of Leonessa
Joseph of Leonessa
Joseph of Leonessa
Joseph of Leonessa
Franciscan saints
Joseph of Leonessa
Canonizations by Pope Benedict XIV
Beatifications by Pope Clement XII